Jason Maroney (born 19 March 1967) is an Australian shooter. He was selected to represent Australia at the 2012 Summer Paralympics in shooting. He did not medal at the 2012 Games.

Personal
Maroney was born on 19 March 1967. He is originally from Glenrowan, Victoria. He spent time in the army. He became a quadriplegic as a result of a car accident when he was 19 years old. He uses a wheelchair.

Shooting
Maroney is a shooter.  He is classified as a SH2 shooter.

Maroney took up competitive shooting in 2004. He first represented Australia in 2005. In 2006, he demonstrated the sport to six people with disabilities as part of a Sporting Shooters Association of Australia (SSAA) held the Shooting For All day event in Springvale. He competed at the 2008 Summer Paralympics, making the finals in the mixed R5-10m air rifle prone SH2 event and finishing sixth overall.  He finished fifth in the mixed R4-10m air rifle standing SH2 event. He finished first at the Korean hosted 2009 Open Asian Championships. He finished second at the 2010 World Championships. He was selected to represent Australia at the 2012 Summer Paralympics in shooting in the R4 and R5 Air Rifle events.  The 2012 Games were his second. He did not medal at the 2012 Games.

References

Paralympic shooters of Australia
Living people
1967 births
Shooters at the 2012 Summer Paralympics
Shooters at the 2008 Summer Paralympics